Owl Creek is a stream in Wood County in the U.S. state of Wisconsin. It is a tributary of the Yellow River within Lake Dexter.

Owl Creek was named for the owls in the area.

References

Rivers of Wood County, Wisconsin
Rivers of Wisconsin